The 1973 Tennessee State Tigers football team represented Tennessee State University as an independent during the 1973 NCAA Division II football season. In their 11th season under head coach John Merritt, the Tigers compiled a 10–0 record and outscored all opponents by a total of 333 to 87. The team was also recognized as the 1973 black college national champion and was ranked No. 1 in the final 1973 NCAA College Division football rankings issued by both the Associated Press and the United Press International.

Tennessee State did not compete in the playoffs "because five of its starters would not be eligible to play." The players in question had sat out their freshmen year ("redshirt") and then played four seasons; under NCAA rules at the time, such players were not eligible for postseason play as fifth-year seniors.

Schedule

References

Tennessee State
Tennessee State Tigers football seasons
NCAA Small College Football Champions
Black college football national champions
College football undefeated seasons
Tennessee State Tigers football